Vlksice is a municipality and village in Písek District in the South Bohemian Region of the Czech Republic. It has about 200 inhabitants.

Administrative parts
Villages and hamlets of Dobřemilice, Klokočov and Střítež are administrative part of Vlksice.

References

Villages in Písek District